Lyca Kovai Kings is a cricket team representing Coimbatore city of Tamil Nadu in the tournament of Tamil Nadu Premier League (TNPL). The team is owned by Lyca Productions. Lyca Kovai Kings won TNPL 2022 jointly with Chepauk Super Gillies due to rain interruption.

Team Squad 2022 season 

 Abhishek Tanwar 
 Ashwin Venketaraman 
 Krishnamoorthy Vignesh
 Manish Ravi
 N Selva Kumaran
 S Ajith Ram
 Sai Sudharsan
 Shahrukh Khan (cricketer)(C)
 Shijit Chandran
 Suresh Kumar J 
 T Natarajan
 U Mukilesh
 Vellaiyappan Yudeeshwaran
 M.Abhinav
 G.Aravindh
 R.Divakar
 V.Ganga Sridhar Raju
 Ishwar Suresh 
 M.Raja
 Ram Arvindh
 C.Shriram 
 B.Surya

Records

References

Tamil Nadu Premier League
Lyca Productions